The 2022 UNAF U-17 Tournament was the 18th edition of the UNAF U-17 Tournament. The tournament took place in Algeria, from 5 to 15 November 2022.
This tournament served as a qualification event for the Africa U-17 Cup of Nations. The champions qualified for the 2023 Africa U-17 Cup of Nations.

Participants
Algeria withdrew from the tournament. The team qualified automatically for the 2023 Africa U-17 Cup of Nations as hosts of the tournament.

Venues

Squads

Match officials
Below the list of the referees:

Tournament
<onlyinclude>

All times are local, WAT/CET (UTC+1).

Qualified teams for Africa U-17 Cup of Nations
The following team qualified for the 2023 Africa U-17 Cup of Nations.

1 Bold indicates champion for that year. Italic indicates host for that year.

Statistics

Goalscorers

References

External links
2022 UNAF U-17 Tournament - unafonline.org

2022 in African football
UNAF U-17 Tournament
UNAF U-17 Tournament